Khlong Yai is a town (thesaban mueang) in Trat Province in east Thailand, capital of the Khlong Yai District, of which it covers part of the tambon Khlong Yai. It is on the coast of the Gulf of Thailand near the border with Cambodia.

Geography
Khlong Yai is found on a thin strip of territory belonging to Thailand along the coast of the Gulf of Thailand. The high rainfall of the area results in dense rain forest along this narrow coastal strip.

Climate
Khlong Yai has a tropical monsoon climate (Köppen climate classification Aw) influenced by the nearby Cardamom Mountains, which amplify the summer monsoon. While no month is truly dry, a short dry season runs from December to January. Rain increases somewhat from February to April, and then the main monsoon season begins in May, lasting until October. The monsoon season features torrential rain, with over  falling in August alone, and over  falling in each of June and July. The rains ease in November, although significant rainfall may still occur.

Transport 
The main road in the area is Route 318, which runs up and down the coast. To the south it connect Khlong Yai to a border crossing to Cambodia at Hat Lek, not far from the Cambodian town of Koh Kong. To north the road connects to Trat, from which Route 3 (the Sukhumvit Road) leads to Bangkok.

References 

Populated places in Trat province
Cambodia–Thailand border crossings